"Exodus" is a song written by reggae musician Bob Marley and recorded by Bob Marley and the Wailers, for the Exodus (1977) album.  Released as a single, it hit number 14 in the UK Singles Chart. "Exodus" was Marley's first single to receive widespread airplay on black radio stations in the U.S., expanding the artist's predominantly white college age and Caribbean expats fanbase in the country.

Overview
The song ties together the Biblical story of Moses leading the Israelites out of Egypt to the hope of Rastafarians to be led to freedom. After an assassination attempt in Jamaica in 1976, Marley fled to London where he recorded the song and album of the same name. He had conceived "Exodus" as the album title before even writing the song. The song has a revolutionary theme punctuated by its chorus of "Exodus, movement of Jah people."

Udiscovermusic wrote that the song was "a rippling, surging, seven-minute call to arms for a nation of displaced souls on the march to a new spiritual homeland. 'We know where we're going/We know where we're from/We're leaving Babylon,' Marley sang against a cyclical riff that was turned, like clay on a potter's wheel, to perfection." In a retrospective review of the album, Patricia Maschino Billboard wrote that the title track was a "scorching mash-up of funk, reggae and disco, punctuated by blasts of regal horns."

According to the sheet music published at Musicnotes.com by Sony/ATV Music Publishing, the song is composed in the key of A minor with Marley's vocal range spanning from G4 to A5.

Chart performance

References

Bob Marley songs
1977 singles
Songs written by Bob Marley
1977 songs
Island Records singles